The 1884 Connecticut gubernatorial election was held on November 4, 1884. Republican nominee Henry Baldwin Harrison defeated Democratic incumbent Thomas M. Waller with 48.12% of the vote.

According to the law at the time, if no candidate received a majority, the state legislature would choose between the top two candidates. As the legislature was controlled by Republicans, they voted for fellow Republican Harrison, even though Waller received more votes. Thus, Harrison won the election.

General election

Candidates
Major party candidates
Henry Baldwin Harrison, Republican
Thomas M. Waller, Democratic

Other candidates
Elisha H. Palmer, Prohibition
James Langdon Curtis, Greenback

Results

References

1884
Connecticut
Gubernatorial